Ang Vong Vathana is the Cambodian Minister of Justice. In 2016, he became the sole Cambodian to be named in the Panama Papers leak, which uncovered he was a shareholder in the offshore venture RCD International which dissolved in 2010; the findings prompted calls for an corruption investigation into Vong Vathana.

References

Living people
Year of birth missing (living people)
Cambodian politicians
People named in the Panama Papers